Zaječar (or ) is a city and the administrative center of the Zaječar District in eastern Serbia. According to the 2011 census, the city administrative area has a population of 59,461 inhabitants. 
Zaječar is widely known for its rock music festival Gitarijada and for the festival dedicated to contemporary art ZALET.

Name

The origin of the name is from the Torlak dialect name for "hare" = zajec /  (in all other Serbian dialects it is zec / , while in Bulgarian it is  / zaek"). It means "the man who breeds and keeps hares".

Folk etymology in Romanian, gives "Zăiicer" as meaning "the Gods are asking (for sacrifice)".

Early renderings of the city in English used Saitchar.

History

Ancient
Three Roman Emperors were born in the city of Zaječar: Galerius (r. 293–311), Maximinus (r. 305–312) and Licinius (r. 308–324).

The Late Roman fortified palace compound and memorial complex of Gamzigrad-Romuliana at the outskirts of Zaječar was commissioned by Emperor Caius Valerius Galerius Maximianus, in the late 3rd and early 4th century. It was known as Felix Romuliana, named after the Emperor's mother Romula. The site consists of fortifications, the palace in the north-western part of the complex, basilicas, temples, hot baths, memorial complex, and a tetrapylon. The site offers a unique testimony of the Roman building tradition marked by the ideology of the period of the Second Tetrachy.  The group of buildings is also unique in its intertwining of ceremonial and memorial functions. The relation between two spatial ensembles in this site is stressed by the tetrapylon which is placed on the crossroads between the worldly fortification and palace on the one side and the other-worldly mausoleums and consecration monuments on the other.

Middle Ages
Slavs entered the region during the 7th century, and the tribe living in the area was called Timočani. During the Middle Ages, the area of Zaječar was contested between Bulgaria, Hungary and Serbia. During periods in the 9th-11th centuries and the 13th century the territory of modern-day Zaječar was a part of the Bulgarian Empire.  It finally fell under Ottoman rule during the first half of the 15th century. The oldest preserved rendering of Zaječar listed in an Ottoman defter dates from 1466. At the time, there were only eight extended families (zadrugas) living there.

Modern
In the First Serb Uprising, Hajduk Veljko Petrović liberated the area from Ottoman rule in 1806.  The Ottomans retook the area in 1813 but finally ceded it to Serbia in 1833.

The population of the city and of the area to the south of it was partly Bulgarian, as the Serbian ethnographer Milan Đ. Milićević recognized.  The city actively participated in the Serbo-Turkish War of 1876-1878.  In 1883, it was partially engulfed in the famous Timok Uprising, a reaction against a governmental order to confiscate peasants' firearms and against a law replacing the militia with a standing army.

Bulgaria  free Zaječar from 1915 to 1918, during the First World War.  From 1929 to 1941, the city was part of the Morava Banovina of the Kingdom of Yugoslavia.  The German army occupied Zaječar on 14 April 1941, during the Second World War; it was administered as part of the Territory of the Military Commander in Serbia from 22 April 1941.  Zaječar was liberated on 7–8 October 1944 in a joint operation by Yugoslav Partisans and the Red Army.

Climate
Zaječar has a humid continental climate (Köppen climate classification: Dfa), that's very close to a humid subtropical climate (Köppen climate classification: Cfa).

Settlements
Aside from the urban area of Zaječar, the city administrative area includes the following settlements:

Borovac
Brusnik
Velika Jasikova
Veliki Izvor
Veliki Jasenovac
Vražogrnac
Vrbica
Gamzigrad
Glogovica
Gornja Bela Reka
Gradskovo
Grlište
Grljan
Dubočane
Zagrađe
Zvezdan
Jelašnica
Klenovac
Koprivnica
Lasovo
Lenovac
Leskovac
Lubnica
Mala Jasikova
Mali Izvor
Mali Jasenovac
Marinovac
Metriš
Nikoličevo
Planinica
Prlita
Rgotina
Salaš
Selačka
Tabakovac
Trnavac
Halovo
Čokonjar
Šipikovo
Šljivar

Demographics

According to the 2011 census, the city of Zaječar has a population of 59,461 inhabitants, while the urban area has 38,165 inhabitants. The city has an urban area of over 97 km².

Ethnic groups
The ethnic composition of the city:

Economy
The following table gives a preview of total number of registered people employed in legal entities per their core activity (as of 2018):

Society and culture

Sport
Zaječar hosted 2006 Serbian triathlon championship. The city has two sport-recreation centers, "Popova plaža" and "SRC Kraljevica" home of ŽRK Zaječar, while a third, "Kotlujevac", is under reconstruction.

Theatre
Zaječar is home to the "Zoran Radmilović" theatre built 2 February 1947 under the name of the "Oblasno narodno pozorište". The first play ever performed in the new theatre was "Žita cvetaju". The theatre was renamed during its 45th (1992) anniversary as "Zoran Radmilović" to celebrate a famous and beloved actor who was born there. Every year, this theatre is home to the "Dani Zorana Radmilovića" art festival.

ZA*73T
The Festival of Contemporary Art ZALET (stylised as ZA*73T) organizes manifestations, such as exhibitions, concerts, literary evenings and experimental theater.

Gitarijada
Gitarijada (Serbian Cyrillic: Гитаријада, trans. Guitar fest) is a musical festival held during the summer in order to promote demo bands. Held since 1969, Gitarijada is one of the longest-lasting festivals in Serbia and in South Eastern Europe. The festival started its life in Zaječar during 1970. Some of notable bands from Serbia such as Bjesovi & Galija were winners in the Gitarijada competition during the '80s and '90s. The programme of the Gitarijada festival has several parts. Demo battles as a main item, with performances of artists and art exhibitions involving themes like rock, blues, metal and similar ones.

Education
Elementary schools

 OŠ "Desanka Maksimović"
 OŠ "Ljuba Nešić"
 OŠ "Djura Jakšić"
 OŠ "Ljubica Radosavljević Nada"
 OŠ "Hajduk Veljko"
 OŠ "Vladislav Petković Dis"
 OŠ "Vuk Karadžić"
 OŠ "Jeremija Ilić Jegor"
 OŠ "Dositej Obradović"
 OŠ "15.maj"
 OŠ "Jovan Jovanovic Zmaj"

High schools

 Gymnasium (since 1836)
 Medical Assistant/Nurse high school
 Technical high school
 Business Assistant and Accountancy high school
 Machine technician high school
 Secondary Music School

University education

The city is the seat of the Megatrend University
Faculty of Management;
Business School of Management.

Twin cities

Zaječar is twinned with:
 Vidin, Bulgaria
 Berkovitsa, Bulgaria
 Calafat, Romania

Notable citizens
The people listed below were born in, residents of, or otherwise closely associated with the city of Zaječar area.

Galerius, Roman Emperor, born in, or of a family origin from, Gamzigrad, near Zaječar, where he built the city of Felix Romuliana.
Licinius, Roman Emperor, born in Moesia, near Zaječar
Vetranio, Roman Emperor, born in Moesia, near Zaječar
Hajduk Veljko Petrović, one of the leaders of the First Serbian Uprising, was born in Lenovac near Zaječar c. 1780.
Nikola Pašić, a Serbian and Yugoslav politician and diplomat, was born in 1845 in Veliki Izvor, then in the vicinity, and today a suburb, of Zaječar.
:sr:Đorđe Genčić, Interior Minister during the reign of Alexander I of Serbia, Mayor of Niš in 1894-1899, was born in Zaječar. In his family house in Belgrade the Nikola Tesla Museum is housed today.
Svetozar Marković, political theorist and activist, was born in Zaječar in 1846.
Simo Matavulj, novelist and short story writer, briefly taught at the Zaječar gymnasium
Zoran Radmilović, comedy and character actor (theatre), was born in Zaječar in 1933.
Mirko Cvetković, Ph.D., Prime Minister of Serbia 2008-2012
Ivana Sert, Serbian-Turkish TV personality, model, and fashion designer.
:fr:Slobodan Misic-Brenda, a Canadian handball coach, was born in Brusnik near Zaječar in 1942.
Dragan Stanković, volleyball player, European champion and World championships bronze medalist.
Boban Marjanović, basketball player for Houston Rockets of the National Basketball Association (NBA) and Serbian national basketball team.
Marko Krsmančić, handball player with international career (Germany, Austria, Turkey, Hungary), played for Serbian National handball Team on World Championship 2013 in Spain.

See also
Zaječar District
List of places in Serbia

References
References

Sources

External links

Official page of Zaječar
Online portal of Zaječar City
Official page of Gitarijada
Official page of ZALET
Official page of theatre "Zoran Radmilović"
Zajecar news

 
Timok Valley
Municipalities and cities of Southern and Eastern Serbia
Populated places in Zaječar District